Yannick Renier (born 29 March 1975) is a Belgian actor who started his career in the theatre in the 1990s and has since appeared in several films and television productions.

Life and career
Renier trained at the Conservatoire Royal in Brussels and started his professional acting career in 1995, appearing in many stage productions of both classical and modern drama.  Renier's first full-length film was Miss Montigny in 2004.

He became widely known in Belgium in 2006 through his role in the first series of the television drama Septième Ciel Belgique.  He then played opposite Isabelle Huppert and his half-brother Jérémie in the film Nue Propriété, and has since appeared in other roles including the lead part of Yves in the 2008 Nés en 68. He was awarded Best Male Newcomer for Yves in Nés en 68 at the 2008 Cabourg Film Festival. For his role in Private Lessons (Élève libre), Renier was nominated for Best Supporting Actor at the 1st Magritte Awards.

Filmography

 1996 : Le Nombril de Saint-Gilles – dir. Christophe Sermet
 2001 : Un portrait – dir. Philippe Murgier
 2002 : Une fille de joie – dir. Olivier van Malderghem
 2004 : Loin des Yeux – dir. Serge Mirzabekiantz
 2004 : Miss Montigny – dir. Miel van Hoogenbemt
 2006 : Septième Ciel Belgique (TV serial)
 2006 : Nue Propriété – dir. Joachim Lafosse
 2007 : Les Chansons d'amour – dir. Christophe Honoré
 2007 : Coupable – dir. Laetitia Masson
 2008 : Nés en 68 – dir. Olivier Ducastel and Jacques Martineau
 2008 : Private Lessons – dir Joachim Lafosse
 2009 : Une petite zone de turbulences
 2009 : Going South
 2010 : Small World
 2011 : Toutes nos envies – dir. Philippe Lioret
 2011 : Early One Morning
 2015 : Les Châteaux de sable
 2015 : The White Knights
 2016 : Tout de suite maintenant
 2017 : Patients
 2021 : Mother Schmuckers

References

External links
 

Belgian male stage actors
Belgian male film actors
Belgian male television actors
Male actors from Brussels
1975 births
Living people
20th-century Belgian male actors
21st-century Belgian male actors